Omicron Coronae Borealis, Latinized from o Coronae Borealis, is a star in the northern constellation of Corona Borealis. It is a faint star but visible to the naked eye on a dark night with an apparent visual magnitude of +5.53. The annual parallax shift of the star as seen from Earth is 12.08 mas, which provides a distance estimate of around 270 light years. It is moving closer to the Sun with a radial velocity of −54 km/s.

Based upon the spectrum of this star, it has a stellar classification of K0 III. This indicates this is an evolved K-type giant star that has exhausted the hydrogen at its core and has left the main sequence. This is a red clump star, which means it is now generating energy through helium fusion at its core. It has 107% of the mass of the Sun and has expanded to over ten times the Sun's radius. The star is radiating 50 times the Sun's luminosity from its expanded photosphere at an effective temperature of 4,812 K.

Planetary system
Omicron Coronae Borealis has one confirmed planet, believed to be, along with HD 100655 b, one of the two least massive planets known around red clump giants. The planet was detected by measuring changes in radial velocity of the host star caused by gravitational perturbation of the orbiting object. It is orbiting with a period of 188 days, at a semimajor axis 83% of the mean separation between the Earth and the Sun, and an eccentricity of 0.19.

References

K-type giants
Horizontal-branch stars
Suspected variables
Planetary systems with one confirmed planet
Corona Borealis, Omicron
Corona Borealis
Durchmusterung objects
Coronae Borealis, 01
136512
075049
5709
J15200853+2936584